Mary ever virgin may refer to:
 Perpetual virginity of Mary
 Mary (mother of Jesus)

See also
 Aeiparthenos
 Virgin Mary (disambiguation)